Lacmellea panamensis is a species of tree in the family Apocynaceae native to Costa Rica, Panama, Nicaragua, Colombia, and Ecuador. It is a medium-sized tree, with a straight trunk, that is scattered with conical spines that are rather blunt, a distinctive feature of the species.

In an artificial experiment, 80% of seedlings were able to survive having their leaves removed, or being placed in deep shade (0.08% of full sunlight), making them relatively shade tolerant.

References

External links
Lacmellea panamensis at Discover Life, including photographs.

Rauvolfioideae
Flora of South America
Flora of Central America
Plants described in 1935